Monoplex exaratus is a species of predatory sea snail, a marine gastropod mollusk in the family Cymatiidae.

Description

Distribution

According to the World Register of Marine Species, Monoplex exaratus is found near Australia, Japan, the Hawaiian Islands, the Red Sea, and South Africa. Sightings have been noted in Senegal and Caribbean Sea, but their veracity as evidence for distribution is doubtful.

References

 Petit R.E. (2009) George Brettingham Sowerby, I, II & III: their conchological publications and molluscan taxa. Zootaxa 2189: 1–218

Cymatiidae
Gastropods described in 1844